Desulfovirgula is a genus of sulfate reducing, anaerobic, endospore-forming, Gram-positive, thermophilic, motile, rod-shaped bacteria, isolated from an underground mining site in an area of Japan characterized by high geothermal activity.

Up to now (December 2021) Desulfovirgula thermocuniculi is the sole known species in the genus.

Electron acceptors that this organism can utilize include sulfate, sulfite, thiosulfate and elemental sulfur, while H2 (in the presence of CO2) and carboxylic acids can be utilized as electron donors.

See also
 List of bacterial orders
 List of bacteria genera

References 

Thermoanaerobacterales
Bacteria genera
Monotypic bacteria genera
Thermophiles
Anaerobes